Sir William Pooley (died 5 August 1629) was an English landowner and politician who sat in the House of Commons at various times between 1621 and 1629.

Pooley was of Boxted, Suffolk and was knighted by James I. In 1621, he was elected Member of Parliament for Preston. He was elected MP for both Preston and Sudbury in 1624 and chose to sit for Sudbury. In 1626 he was elected MP for Wigan. He was elected MP for Sudbury again in 1628 and sat until 1629 when King Charles decided to rule without parliament, and then did so for eleven years.
 
His daughter Judith married Sir Humphrey May.

References

 

 

Year of birth missing
1629 deaths
English landowners
People from Babergh District
English MPs 1621–1622
English MPs 1624–1625
English MPs 1626
English MPs 1628–1629